Sheriff Awilo Suma (born 12 October 1986) is a Sierra Leonean professional footballer who plays as a left winger for Atlanta SC and the Sierra Leone national football team. He was a member of Sierra Leone U-17 team at the 2003 FIFA U-17 World Championship in Finland. Suma made his senior international debut for Sierra Leone on 3 September 2006 in a 2008 African Nations Cup qualifying match against Mali in Freetown.

Suma is one of the most popular Sierra Leonean footballers and he is known for frequently changing his unusual and colourful hairstyles.

Football career
Suma was born in Freetown, Sierra Leone. Like many African footballers, Suma grew up playing street football in his neighbourhood.

He fled his country's civil war and moved to The Gambia in 1997. Suma was widely considered the best Sierra Leonean youth footballer while in The Gambia. In 2001, the young Suma was discovered by Sierra Leonean football agent Chernor Musa Jalloh while playing in a local football league in Banjul, Gambia. Jalloh introduced Suma to Mohamed Kallon, Sierra Leone's most successful footballer. Kallon asked him if he would like to play for Kallon F.C. in the Sierra Leone National Premier League. Suma returned to Sierra Leone for the first time in five years in 2002 and sign for top Sierra Leone National Premier League club FC Kallon, which is owned by Mohamed Kallon himself. In his first season in the Sierra Leonean Premier League, Suma was the second top goal-scorer.

After playing in the qualifying rounds, Suma was omitted from the final squad for the 2003 African U-17 Championship in Swaziland, something he describes as the worst moment of his life. In the championship, Sierra Leone placed second, behind Cameroon, thereby qualifying for the 2003 FIFA U-17 World Championship in Finland.

Fortunately for Suma, he was called back to the squad for the U-17 world championship in Finland. While the team failed to advance past the group stage of the tournament, the coach commended Suma for his energy and flair with the ball. Following this event, 12 of the 23 players failed to return to Sierra Leone and some later applied for political asylum. Among those who did return home was Suma.

Shortly after the U-17 world championship, talent scout Chernor Musa Jalloh helped Suma move to the Swedish team Åtvidaberg on a two-year contract from Kallon F.C.. In December 2006, Suma was traded to GAIS, one of Sweden's oldest teams.

Suma was loaned to FK Haugesund in the summer of 2008 for the rest of the season.

In December 2012 Suma was released from his contract with Ravan Baku.

In June 2014 Suma joined Syrianska Kerburan with fellow Sierra Leone International Samuel Barlay, signing a new one-year contract with Syrianska Kerburan in December 2014.

In July 2015, Suma's proposed move to Kvik Halden FK fell through, before later in the same month he re-signed for Azerbaijan Premier League side Ravan Baku FK.

Career statistics

References

External links
 Profile at goal.com
 

1986 births
Living people
Susu people
Sportspeople from Freetown
Association football midfielders
Sierra Leonean footballers
GAIS players
Åtvidabergs FF players
FK Haugesund players
Ermis Aradippou FC players
Kocaelispor footballers
Jönköpings Södra IF players
Syrianska IF Kerburan players
Ravan Baku FC players
Expatriate footballers in Norway
Expatriate footballers in Cyprus
Sierra Leonean expatriate footballers
Expatriate footballers in the Gambia
Sierra Leonean Muslims
Sierra Leonean expatriate sportspeople in Norway
Sierra Leone international footballers
Sierra Leonean people of Guinean descent
Allsvenskan players
Superettan players
Norwegian First Division players
Cypriot First Division players
TFF First League players
Azerbaijan Premier League players
Atlanta Silverbacks players
Expatriate soccer players in the United States
Sierra Leonean expatriate sportspeople in the United States
National Premier Soccer League players
National Independent Soccer Association players